Zeyn ol Hajjilu (also Romanized as Zeyn ol Ḩājjīlū and Zīn al Ḩājjīlū'; also known as Zeynāl Āghāj) is a village in Shurakat-e Jonubi Rural District, Ilkhchi District, Osku County, East Azerbaijan Province, Iran. At the 2006 census, its population was 1,443, in 357 families.

References 

Populated places in Osku County